Streptomyces qinglanensis is a bacterium species from the genus of Streptomyces which has been isolated from mangrove soil from Wenchang in the Hainan in China.

See also 
 List of Streptomyces species

References

Further reading

External links
Type strain of Streptomyces qinglanensis at BacDive -  the Bacterial Diversity Metadatabase	

qinglanensis
Bacteria described in 2012